Delhi Gate is a station on the Delhi Metro system.

The station

Station layout

Facilities

Connections
It has a connection of Arun Jaitley Stadium.

Bus
Delhi Transport Corporation bus routes number 19B, 39, 39A, 39STL, 88A, 114ST, 120B, 157STL, 171, 185, 210, 213, 214, 214CL, 246, 258SPL, 273, 307, 307A, 308, 309, 309EXT, 331LnkSTL, 729, 753, 773, 807A, 838, 853, 857, 901, 917, 918, 949, 949A, 949EXT, 954 serves the station.

Rail
New Delhi railway station of Indian Railways situated nearby.

Entry/Exit

See also

Delhi
List of Delhi Metro stations
Transport in Delhi
Delhi Metro Rail Corporation
Delhi Suburban Railway
Delhi Monorail
Delhi Transport Corporation
Central Delhi
National Capital Region (India)
List of rapid transit systems
List of metro systems

References

External links

 Delhi Metro Rail Corporation Ltd. (Official site) 
 Delhi Metro Annual Reports
 
 UrbanRail.Net – descriptions of all metro systems in the world, each with a schematic map showing all stations.

Delhi Metro stations
Railway stations in New Delhi district
Railway stations in India opened in 2017